Cutina albopunctella, the cypress looper or white-spotted cutina moth, is a species of moth in the family Erebidae. It is found in North America.

The MONA or Hodges number for Cutina albopunctella is 8728.

References

Further reading

 
 
 

Euclidiini
Articles created by Qbugbot
Moths described in 1866